Same-sex marriage in the Faroe Islands has been legal since 1 July 2017. Legislation allowing same-sex marriage and adoption by same-sex couples was approved by the Løgting on 29 April 2016. The Danish Parliament approved the necessary legislative adaptations on 25 April 2017, and the law received royal assent on 3 May and went into effect on 1 July 2017.

The Faroe Islands, an autonomous territory within the Kingdom of Denmark, was the last Nordic region to introduce same-sex marriage.

Registered partnerships
Unlike Denmark and Greenland, the Faroe Islands never adopted registered partnerships, which would have offered same-sex couples some of the rights, benefits and responsibilities of marriage.

Same-sex marriage

Failed attempts in 2013–2014
Same-sex marriage legislation first appeared in the Løgting after the Tórshavn gay pride parade in 2012. A set of bills to extend Denmark's same-sex marriage law to the Faroe Islands was submitted to the Løgting on 20 November 2013. If approved, they would have entered into force on 1 April 2014. Opposition to the bills from the parties of the governing coalition crippled their passage and the bills were rejected at the second reading on 13 March 2014, despite popular public support.

Same-sex marriage became a significant issue in the September 2015 elections.

Introduction of legislation (2016)

Following the September 2015 election, MPs Sonja Jógvansdóttir, Bjørt Samuelsen, Kristianna Winther Poulsen and Hanna Jensen submitted a same-sex marriage bill to the Parliament Secretariat. The proposal, along with a bill permitting same-sex divorce, entered the Løgting on 17 November 2015. If approved, the law would be scheduled to go into effect on 1 July 2016.

The first reading took place on 24 November 2015. Though a majority of the committee scrutinising the bill were in favour of same-sex marriage, the second reading was postponed to the third week of March 2016. On 14 March 2016, the Welfare Committee presented their recommendation to the Løgting. Despite divisions, a majority of committee members, including Katrin Kallsberg, Sonja Jógvansdóttir, Óluva Klettskarð and Djóni N. Joensen, recommended the Parliament to pass the bill. Members of the committee in the minority, Kaj Leo Johannesen, Jenis av Rana and Jógvan á Lakjuni, recommended that the bill be rejected.

The second reading was held on 16 March 2016. There was not a majority for the proposal, as two members from the governing coalition, Kristin Michelsen and Heðin Mortensen from the Social Democratic Party, said they would not support the proposal at this stage, and suggested that the bill be sent back to the Welfare Committee for amendments. They and several other members of the Løgting raised concerns that the legislation would mandate a right to same-sex marriages in the Church of the Faroe Islands. Following a short break, the Løgting voted to send the bill back to the committee by a vote of 26–2 with 5 abstentions. During the debate, several conservative members, who had vocally stated their opposition to same-sex partnerships in the past, said they would support legalizing registered partnerships for same-sex couples.

Some members of the Løgting raised concerns about Section 14,2 of the Danish Marriage Act, which stated that couples who have a civil marriage may have their marriage blessed by the state church. In response to this concern, the Welfare Committee later moved an amendment stating that the proposed new marriage law in the Faroe Islands would not be implemented by the Løgting before Section 14,2 had been either deleted or refrased.

Passage in the Løgting
The bill returned to the Løgting in its amended form for a second reading on 26 April 2016. Debate began at 11 a.m. and concluded well after midnight on 27 April. During the debate, Mortensen introduced a proposal to conduct a referendum on the subject, which precipitated a crisis in the coalition government. During a 90-minute break in proceedings, Mortensen engaged in high-level talks on the matter with Prime Minister Aksel V. Johannesen and other members of the Løgting. He eventually withdrew his proposal, telling Kringvarp Føroya that he would not risk dividing or even possibly dissolving the coalition government.

A few minutes later, a vote was held on the second reading, resulting in 19 votes in favour and 14 against. Every Government MP, Independent MP Sonja Jógvansdóttir and two Opposition MPs (Magni Laksáfoss and Edmund Joensen of the Union Party) voted in favor. The bill was approved in its third and final reading on 29 April, again by a 19–14 vote. At this point, a vote was held on a proposal for a referendum on the subject, though it was defeated in a 16–17 vote.

Additional legislation and commencement (2017)

The Faroese bill required amendments to Danish marriage law to be enacted by the Danish Parliament. A bill to this effect was introduced to the Danish Parliament on 8 February 2017, and had its first reading on 28 February 2017. The relevant parliamentary committee approved the bill on 4 April, and the second reading was held on 20 April 2017. The bill passed its third and final reading on 25 April 2017 by a vote of 108–0 with 71 abstentions. It received royal assent by Queen Margrethe II on 3 May 2017. On 30 May 2017, the Løgting passed legislation which exempts the Church of the Faroe Islands from the obligation to bless same-sex marriages by a vote of 18–14 with no abstentions. Finally, a Danish royal decree formally necessary to give effect to the initial Løgting decision of 29 April 2016 was issued on 12 June 2017 and published on 16 June. Same-sex marriages have been available from 1 July 2017, the date the law came into effect.

The first same-sex wedding in the Faroe Islands was performed on 6 September 2017 at Tórshavn City Hall between British couple Leslie Travers and Richard McBride.

Equal parentage legislation (2021–2022)
In December 2021, the Løgting passed two bills by an 18–13 vote guaranteeing equal parentage rights to married same-sex couples, including on parental leave. Prime Minister Bárður á Steig Nielsen supported the bills, stating that "all parents should have the right to financial support". The laws went into effect on 1 January 2022.

Marriages in the Church of the Faroe Islands
Opposition from several members of the Løgting resulted in the Church of the Faroe Islands, the state church, being exempt from blessing same-sex marriages. The church can provide such blessings if the Church Assembly were to vote in favor of it.

Public opinion
A May 2013 Gallup survey found that 68% of Faroese people supported same-sex marriage, 27% were against and 5% were undecided.

Another poll conducted in May 2014 found that regional divisions were significant in attitudes towards same-sex marriage, despite its overall results being similar to previous polls: 62% support, 28% opposition and 10% undecided. Support was lowest in Norðoyar and Eysturoy at 42% and 48% respectively, and highest in Suðurstreymoy, which contains the capital Tórshavn, at 76%.

A poll conducted in August 2014 found that out of 600 respondents, 61% supported same-sex marriage, 32% were opposed and the remainder were undecided.

A poll conducted by Gallup Føroyar in April 2016, requested by Kringvarp Føroya and Miðlahúsið, showed that 64% of respondents supported legalizing same-sex marriage. Support varied by age, with 79% of 18–24-year-olds being in favour, but only 53% of those aged 60 and above supporting. The capital area, Suðurstreymoy, had the highest level of support at 79%, while opposition was strongest in Norðoyar and Eysturoy, which showed 45% and 42% opposition respectively. A majority of voters from most political parties supported same-sex marriage: Progress voters at 89%, followed by Republic voters at 83%, 75% of Social Democratic voters and 62% of Self-Government Party voters. 50% of voters from both the Union Party and the People's Party also supported same-sex marriage. Centre Party voters were the only notable exception, with only 16% supporting same-sex marriage, while 84% were opposed.

A poll conducted in September 2019 found that 71.1% of Faroese people were against repealing the same-sex marriage law, 16.3% were in favour and 12.6% were undecided. When broken down by political party, the results are the following: Republic voters (96% support, 3% opposition), Social Democrats (91% support, 3% opposition), Progress voters (77% support, 19% opposition), Union Party voters (67% support, 17% opposition), People's Party voters (46% support, 32% opposition), Self-Government voters (38% support, 36% opposition), and Centre Party voters (27% support, 52% opposition).

See also
 LGBT rights in the Faroe Islands
 Same-sex marriage in Denmark
 Recognition of same-sex unions in Europe

Notes

References

External links
 Anordning nr. 724 frá 12. juni 2017 om delvis ikrafttræden for Færøerne af lov om ægteskabs indgåelse og opløsning, lov om ægteskabets retsvirkninger og retsplejeloven og om ophævelse af lov om registreret partnerskab, Retsinformation.dk (in Danish)

LGBT rights in the Faroe Islands
Faroe Islands
2017 in LGBT history
Faroe Islands
Faroe Islands